Cooper Connolly (born 22 August 2003) is an Australian cricketer. He is a left-handed batter and a slow left-arm orthodox bowler, who plays for the Perth Scorchers in the Big Bash League. In January 2022, he was named as the captain of the Australia national under-19 cricket team for the 2022 ICC Under-19 Cricket World Cup. The allrounder also captained the Western Australia under-17 cricket team. In August 2022, he was signed by the Perth Scorchers to play for them in the 2022–23 Big Bash League season. He made his Twenty20 debut for the Scorchers, on 7 January 2023 against the Brisbane Heat in the 2022–23 Big Bash League. He played in the final and got 25 runs off 11 balls to win the match for the Scorchers.

References

External links
 
 

Living people
Australian cricketers
Perth Scorchers cricketers
Cricketers from Perth, Western Australia
2003 births